Tommy Conroy is an Irish Gaelic footballer who plays for The Neale and at senior level for the Mayo county team.

References

Living people
Gaelic football forwards
Mayo inter-county Gaelic footballers
2000 births